Roger Whelan (born 27 July 1980) is a former Irish cricketer. He is a right-handed batsman and a right-arm medium-fast bowler who has played with Ireland's cricket team since the Eurasia cricket series of 2006.

Whelan is a lower-order batsman. His sisters, Heather and Jill Whelan, play for the Irish ladies team.

Whelan notably took the wicket of Indian legend Sachin Tendulkar on his debut 23 June 2007 at Belfast's Stormont Ground.

On 17 November 2007, Whelan announced his retirement from all forms of cricket to concentrate on his future with his band, The RoJ LiGht.

External links
Roger Whelan at CricketArchive 

1980 births
Irish cricketers
Ireland One Day International cricketers
Living people